Syntomeida is a genus of tiger moths in the family Erebidae.

Species
Syntomeida epilais (Walker, 1854) – polka-dot wasp moth
Syntomeida hampsonii Barnes, 1904
Syntomeida ipomoeae (Harris, 1839) – yellow-banded wasp moth
Syntomeida joda (Druce, 1897)
Syntomeida melanthus (Cramer, [1779]) – black-banded wasp moth
Syntomeida syntomoides (Boisduval, 1836)
Syntomeida vulcana Druce, 1889
Syntomeida wrighti (Gundlach, 1881)

References

Natural History Museum Lepidoptera generic names catalog

Euchromiina
Moth genera